An Le better known as Balls, is an American League of Legends player who most recently played professionally as the top laner for FlyQuest. As a member of Cloud9, Balls lost the League of Legends Championship Series North America (NA LCS) twice and qualified for the League of Legends World Championship every year he was a part of the team.

Playing career
Le began his career in 2011 as a part of North American team APictureOfAGoose. Le left the team in October 2012 and subsequently signed with team Meat Playground. Ten days after the 2013 NA LCS Spring Split qualifier, Meat Playground disbanded. Shortly after, Le signed with Cloud9.

On July 17, 2015, Balls was listed as a substituted of C9 Tempest, the Challenger Series team. On April 21, 2016, Cloud9 created its Challenger team headlined by Hai and Balls. In 2017, Le signed with FlyQuest. Although he never announced his retirement, Balls did not sign with another team after the 2017 season.

Tournament results

Cloud9
 5/8th -  2013 League of Legends World Championship
 3rd/4th - IEM Season VIII - Cologne
 5/8th - 2014 League of Legends World Championship
 2nd - 2015 North American League of Legends Championship Series Spring Playoffs
 9/11th - 2015 League of Legends World Championship

References

Cloud9 (esports) players
American esports players
American people of Vietnamese descent
1994 births
Counter Logic Gaming players
Living people
League of Legends top lane players
People from Pharr, Texas
MTw players
FlyQuest players